The G&S 27 is an American sailboat that was designed by Graham & Schlageter as a Midget Ocean Racing Club (MORC) racer and first built in 1986.

The boat is very similar to the Mariah 27, also designed by Graham & Schlageter in 1986.

Design
The G&S 27 is a racing keelboat, built predominantly of fiberglass. It has a masthead sloop rig, a raked stem, a plumb transom, a transom-hung rudder controlled by a tiller and a fixed fin keel. It displaces  and carries  of ballast.

See also
List of sailing boat types

References

External links
Photo of a G&S 27 sailing
 Photo of a G&S 27 hull

Keelboats
1980s sailboat type designs
Sailing yachts
Sailboat types built in the United States
Sailboat type designs by Graham & Schlageter